José Manuel Zacarías Gómez Valdés (4 November 1813 – 27 July 1871) was a 19th-century Mexican lawyer and politician who served as interim governor of Nuevo León (1866–1867), senator, and congressman in the Chamber of Deputies representing the states of Nuevo León and Tamaulipas.

As congressman, he celebrated the annexation of Coahuila by Nuevo León and during his administration, he was satirized by El cura de Tamajón, an ephemeral weekly publication edited by Jesús Flores and written mostly by Guillermo Prieto during his stay in Monterrey.

Aside from his political activities, Gómez also presided over Nuevo León's Supreme Tribunal of Justice in 1867.

Works

See also
Governor of Nuevo León

Notes and references

1813 births
1871 deaths
Governors of Nuevo León
Members of the Senate of the Republic (Mexico)
Members of the Chamber of Deputies (Mexico)
Lawyers from Nuevo León
Politicians from Linares, Nuevo León